Live is a live album by American pop singer Johnny Mathis that was released in October 15, 1984, by Columbia Records and includes performances of some of his classics ("Misty", "The Twelfth of Never", "Chances Are"), songs from recent albums ("Begin the Beguine", "Memory", "Orange Colored Sky"), and three selections that have never appeared on a Mathis studio album ("I Believe in Love", "Fly Away", "Try to Win a Friend").

On October 24, 1995, the album was released for a second time on compact disc as part of a 3-disc set that also included Mathis's 1959 studio album Heavenly and the 1977 stereo reissue of 1958's Johnny's Greatest Hits.

Reception

William Ruhlmann of AllMusic wrote retrospectively: "Mathis has always been an expert at finding and performing music that ties together the often disparate styles of popular music over four decades, and his choices here are characteristic. Of course, he also performs them winningly with effective backup."

Track listing
From the liner notes for the original album:

 "I Believe in Love" (Alan Bergman, Marilyn Bergman, Kenny Loggins) – 3:31
 Jim Barnett – arranger 
 "Misty" (Johnny Burke, Erroll Garner) – 3:07
 Glenn Osser – arranger 
 "Begin the Beguine" (Cole Porter) – 3:47
 Gene Page – arranger 
Victor Vanacore – arranger
 "Fly Away" (Peter Allen, David Foster, Carole Bayer Sager) – 3:46
 Larry Steelman – arranger 
 "A Certain Smile" (Sammy Fain, Paul Francis Webster) – 3:44
 Larry Steelman – arranger 
 "Memory" (T. S. Eliot, Trevor Nunn, Andrew Lloyd Webber) – 3:00
 Gene Page – arranger 
 Larry Steelman – arranger 
 "The Twelfth of Never" (Jerry Livingston, Paul Francis Webster) – 3:06
 Michel Colombier – arranger 
 Gil Reigers – arranger 
 "Try to Win a Friend" (Larry Gatlin) – 3:30
 Gil Reigers – arranger 
 "99 Miles from L.A." (Hal David, Albert Hammond) – 3:35 
 Michel Colombier – arranger (strings) 
 Gil Reigers – arranger 
 "Chances Are" (Robert Allen, Al Stillman) – 3:10
Ray Conniff – arranger
 "Orange Colored Sky" (Milton DeLugg, Willie Stein) – 3:09
 Allyn Ferguson – arranger 
 "When a Child Is Born" (Ciro Dammicco, Fred Jay) – 3:41
 Jim Barnett – arranger 
 Gene Page – arranger

Song information

"I Believe in Love" was performed by Barbra Streisand on the soundtrack of the 1976 film A Star Is Born but was released as a single by Kenny Loggins in 1977 that reached number 37 on Billboard magazine's list of the 50 most popular Easy Listening songs in the US and number 66 on the Billboard Hot 100. "Fly Away" had its best showing on these two charts by different artists: in 1981 Peter Allen took the song to number 55 on the Hot 100 and number 45 on what was now the Adult Contemporary chart, whereas Stevie Woods made it to number 23 Adult Contemporary and number 84 pop with the song in 1982. And "Try to Win a Friend" was included on two albums in 1973: Larry Gatlin's The Pilgrim and Dottie West's If It's Alright with You/Just What I've Been Looking For.

Personnel
From the liner notes for the original album:

 Performers
Johnny Mathis – vocals
Jim Ganduglia – conductor
Michael Bach – bass
Joe Lizama – drums
Gil Reigers – guitar
Larry Steelman – piano

 Production
Denny Diante – producer
Larry Hirsch – engineer
Bill Jackson – additional engineer
Terry Christian – additional engineer
Jo-Anne McGettrick – A&R Coordinator
Nancy Donald – design
Tony Lane – design
Sam Emerson – photographer
Mixed at Sunset Sound Studios, Hollywood, California

References

Bibliography

 

1984 live albums
Johnny Mathis live albums
Columbia Records live albums